Excoecaria borneensis is a species of flowering plant in the family Euphorbiaceae. It was described in 1914. It is native to Malesia.

References

borneensis
Plants described in 1914
Flora of Malesia